Hirani is a surname. Notable people with the surname include:

 Kishan Hirani (born 1992), Welsh snooker player
 Rajkumar Hirani (born 1962), Indian film director, producer, screenwriter, and editor

See also
 Hiran (disambiguation)